The Hamilton Ward is a Brisbane City Council ward covering Hamilton, Albion, Ascot, Clayfield, Eagle Farm, Hendra, Kalinga, Pinkenba, Wooloowin, and parts of Nundah and Windsor.

Councillors for Hamilton Ward

Results

References 

City of Brisbane wards